Alenka Irsic  (born ) is a Slovenian Paralympic sitting volleyball player. She is part of the Slovenia women's national sitting volleyball team.

She competed at the 2012 Summer Paralympics finishing 6th.

See also
 Slovenia at the 2012 Summer Paralympics

References

External links
https://www.rtvslo.si/sport/strani/alenka-irsic/4321
http://www.worldparavolley.org/wp-content/uploads/2016/07/World-ParaVolley-International-Classification-Master-List-July-3-2016.pdf 

1968 births
Living people
Volleyball players at the 2012 Summer Paralympics
Paralympic competitors for Slovenia
Slovenian sportswomen
Slovenian sitting volleyball players
Women's sitting volleyball players